Blastobasis anthoptera is a moth of the  family Blastobasidae. It is found in Australia and New Guinea.

External links
Australian Faunal Directory

Moths of Australia
Blastobasis
Moths described in 1907
Moths of New Guinea